Tambohorano Airport is an airport in Tambohorano, Melaky Region, Madagascar .

Airlines and destinations

References

Airports in Madagascar
Melaky